Islands is the fourth studio album by English band King Crimson, released in December 1971 on the record label Island. Islands is the only studio album to feature the 1971-1972 touring line-up of Robert Fripp, Mel Collins, Boz Burrell and Ian Wallace. This would be the last album before an entirely new group (except for Fripp) would record the trilogy of Larks' Tongues in Aspic, Starless and Bible Black and Red between 1973-1974. This is also the last album to feature the lyrics of co-founding member Peter Sinfield.

Musically, the album expands on the improvisational jazz leanings of King Crimson's previous album, Lizard. It received a mixed response from critics and fans.

Content 

The harmonic basis for the tune "The Letters" is derived from the Giles, Giles and Fripp song "Why Don't You Just Drop In", available on The Brondesbury Tapes compilation. The bridge section is also taken from the King Crimson version of the song, performed by the original line-up, titled simply "Drop In" and later released on the live-album Epitaph.

The lyrics to "Ladies of the Road" are a series of male sexual fantasies revolving around "girls of the road", i.e. groupies. Lyricist Peter Sinfield later commented on the song: "... everybody writes at least one groupie song. We shouldn't. But we do. It is the ultimate sexist lyric of all time. I couldn't imagine anyone taking it too seriously, because in those days you were still able to say things like 'my lady' with a capital M and a capital L." [emphasis in original]

The original basis for the song "Prelude: Song of the Gulls" is derived from the Giles, Giles and Fripp song "Suite No. 1".

The first vinyl release of the album features a hidden track. At the end of side two there is a recording of studio chatter followed by Fripp saying, among other things, "...What we're going to do, umm... do it twice more, once with the oboe, once without it, and then... we finish." This was included on the initial CD release but was accidentally left off the first pressings of the 1989 Definitive Edition CD remaster. It was restored on all subsequent reissues, and has been used as "walk on" music for all shows starting in 2014.

Album cover

The original United Kingdom and European cover depicts the Trifid Nebula in Sagittarius and displays neither the name of the band nor the title. The original United States and Canadian album cover (as released by Atlantic) was a Peter Sinfield painting of off-white with coloured "islands". This was used as an internal gatefold sleeve in the UK. When the King Crimson catalogue was re-issued by EG, they standardised on the "Trifid Nebula" cover worldwide.

Release 

Released on 3 December 1971, Islands reached number 30 in the UK Albums Chart.

The album was re-released in 2010 as the fifth release in King Crimson's 40th Anniversary series, featuring new stereo and 5.1 surround mixes by Steven Wilson and Robert Fripp, Sid Smith sleeve notes and extra tracks and alternative versions. The DVD-A presents a 5.1 surround sound mix by Wilson, a hi-res stereo version of the 2010 mix, a hi-res stereo version of the original album mix taken from the 30th anniversary master source and previously unreleased material, including studio takes mixed from the original recording sessions.

Reception 

Retrospective reviews have been mixed, with critics generally praising the band's performances while finding the compositions and album structure aimless. AllMusic called it "the weakest Crimson studio album from their first era" that "is only a real disappointment in relation to the extraordinarily high quality of the group's earlier efforts." Conversely, All About Jazz described the album as a "well-conceived, tremendously executed and perfectly sequenced collection", and complimented Fripp's utilization of "a more sophisticated jazz vernacular" in a rock context.

Track listing

All songs written by Robert Fripp and Peter Sinfield, except where noted.

Personnel
King Crimson
Robert Fripp – guitar, mellotron, harmonium (6), production
Peter Sinfield – lyrics, cover design and painting, production
Mel Collins – saxophones, flute, bass flute (6), backing vocals, production
Ian Wallace – drums, percussion, backing vocals, production
Boz – bass, lead vocals, production

Additional personnel
Paulina Lucas – soprano vocals (1)
Keith Tippett – piano
Robin Miller – oboe
Mark Charig – cornet
Harry Miller – double bass (1, 6)
Wilf Gibson - violin (1), string orchestra leader (5, 6) (uncredited)
Uncredited musicians – strings (2, 5, 6)
Andy Hendrikson – recording, engineering
Tony Arnold – mastering
Vick & Mike – equipment
Robert Ellis – photography

2009 40th Anniversary Series re-issue personnel

Steven Wilson – mixing, production, compilation and coordination input and suggestions
Simon Heyworth (Super Audio Mastering) – stereo file preparation, 5.1 mastering
Claire Bidwell (Opus Productions) – DVD design and layout
Neil Wilkes (Opus Productions) – DVD authoring and assembly
Jon Urban, Bob Romano, Bob Squires, Patrick Cleasby, Tim McDonnell & Chris Gerhard – DVD QC testing
Kevin Vanbergen (FX Copyroom) – multitrack tape restoration and transfers
Alex R. Mundy – DGM tape archiving
Hugh O'Donnell – package art and design
Declan Colgan (DGM) – compilation, coordination
Sid Smith – liner notes, compilation and coordination input and suggestions
John Kimber – US vinyl record sleeve scan

Charts

References

External links 
 

King Crimson albums
1971 albums
Island Records albums
Atlantic Records albums
Polydor Records albums
E.G. Records albums
Virgin Records albums
Albums produced by Robert Fripp
Albums produced by Peter Sinfield